The 2018–19 Real Sociedad season was the club's 72nd season in La Liga. This article shows player statistics and all matches (official and friendly) played by the club during the 2018–19 season.

The season was the first since 2002-03 without Xabi Prieto, who retired after the 2017-18 season.

Players

Current squad

Reserve team

Out on loan

Transfers

In

Out

Competitions

Overall

La Liga

League table

Results summary

Results by round

Matches

Copa del Rey

Round of 32

Round of 16

Statistics

Appearances and goals
Last updated on 18 May 2019

|-
! colspan=14 style=background:#dcdcdc; text-align:center|Goalkeepers

|-
! colspan=14 style=background:#dcdcdc; text-align:center|Defenders

|-
! colspan=14 style=background:#dcdcdc; text-align:center|Midfielders

|-
! colspan=14 style=background:#dcdcdc; text-align:center|Forwards

|-
|}

Goalscorers

References

Real Sociedad seasons
Real Sociedad